Quest Software, also known as Quest, is a privately held software company headquartered in Aliso Viejo, California, United States. Quest provides cloud management, software as a service, security, workforce mobility, and backup & recovery. The company was founded in 1987 and has 53 offices in 24 countries.

History 
Quest Software was founded in 1987 in Newport Beach, California, with a line of products for HP Multi-Programming Executive (MPE). In 1995, Vinny Smith joined the company. The following year, Quest entered the database management market with an Oracle SQL database tuning product. In 1997, Quest opened an office in the United Kingdom. 

Doug Garn joined Quest as the Vice President of Sales in 1998. That same year, Quest added offices in Germany and Australia, and Smith became CEO. In October, Quest acquired TOAD. 

On August 13, 1999, Quest Software went public.

In 2002, a Quest office opened in Japan. The next year, Quest opened new offices in Asia, specifically in Singapore, Korea, and China. In 2004, Gartner named Quest number one in application management. Doug Garn became President of Quest Software in 2005.

Doug Garn became CEO and President, and Vinny Smith became Executive Chairman of Quest in 2008. In 2009, Alan Fudge became vice president of sales. In 2011, Vinny Smith became CEO and Chairman, and Doug Garn became Vice Chairman. 

On September 28, 2012, Dell announced it had completed the acquisition of Quest Software.

In 2016, Quest Software acquired ScriptLogic, and Charonware s.r.o from the Czech Republic. Charonware made CASE Studio2, and after being acquired, Quest folded it into the TOAD Data Modeler product.

On November 1, 2016, Francisco Partners and Elliott Management completed the purchase of Dell Software, and the company re-launched itself as Quest Software. 

On June 1, 2017, One Identity was announced as an independent brand, but remained part of the Quest family of businesses.

On September 2, 2020, Quest acquired Binary Tree. On January 5, 2021, Quest acquired erwin, Inc., including erwin Data Modeler.

On November 29, 2021, Clearlake Capital bought Quest from Francisco Partners for $5.4 billion, including debt.

Awards 
The following table includes the listing and the timeline of awards and recognition that Quest Software received since 2004.

References 

 
Software companies based in California
Technology companies based in Greater Los Angeles
Companies based in Aliso Viejo, California
Software companies established in 1987
1987 establishments in California
American companies established in 1987
Privately held companies based in California
2012 mergers and acquisitions
2016 mergers and acquisitions
Private equity portfolio companies
Software companies of the United States